John William Meriwether (born August 10, 1947) is an American hedge fund executive.

Education
Meriwether earned an undergraduate degree from Northwestern University and an MBA degree from the University of Chicago Booth School of Business.

Salomon Brothers
After graduation, Meriwether moved to New York City, where he worked as a bond trader at Salomon Brothers. At Salomon, Meriwether rose to become the head of the domestic fixed income arbitrage group in the early 1980s and vice-chairman of the company in 1988. In 1991, Salomon was caught in a Treasury securities trading scandal perpetrated by a Meriwether subordinate, Paul Mozer. Meriwether was assessed $50,000 in civil penalties.

LTCM
Meriwether founded the Long-Term Capital Management hedge fund in Greenwich, Connecticut in 1994. Long-Term Capital Management collapsed in 1998. The books When Genius Failed: The Rise and Fall of Long-Term Capital Management and Inventing Money: The Story of Long-Term Capital Management and the Legends Behind It detail the events leading up to and following Long-Term Capital Management's demise.

JWM Partners
A year after LTCM's collapse, in 1999, Meriwether founded JWM Partners LLC. The Greenwich, Connecticut hedge fund opened with $250 million under management in 1999 and by 2007 had approximately $3 billion. The Financial crisis of 2007-2009 badly battered Meriwether's firm. From September 2007 to February 2009, his main fund lost 44 percent. On July 8, 2009, Meriwether closed the fund.

JM Advisors
Meriwether opened his third hedge fund venture, named JM Advisors Management, also based in Greenwich, Connecticut, in 2010. The fund is expected to use similar strategies as both LTCM and JWM, namely highly leveraged "relative value arbitrage".  By March 2011, however, the JM Advisors Macro Fund had raised only $28.85 million. As of 2011 it managed roughly $108.85 million.

Thoroughbred racing
Meriwether has been an owner of thoroughbred horses for a number of years and is a member of the board of directors of the New York Racing Association (NYRA). He notably campaigned Buckhan, the winner of the 1993 Washington, D.C. International Stakes.

See also
 List of trading losses
 Liar's Poker
 When Genius Failed
 Black swan problem

References

Further reading

External links
 Case Study: Long-Term Capital Management
 Meriwether and Strange Weather: Intelligence, Risk Management and Critical Thinking

1947 births
American bankers
American financial company founders
American financiers
American hedge fund managers
American investors
American money managers
American racehorse owners and breeders
American stock traders
Businesspeople from Chicago
Living people
Long-Term Capital Management
New York Racing Association executives
Northwestern University alumni
Businesspeople from Greenwich, Connecticut
University of Chicago Booth School of Business alumni